Hussein Abdul-Wahid is a given name. Notable people with the name include:

 Hussein Abdul-Wahid Waham (born 1985), Iraqi footballer
 Hussein Abdul-Wahid Khalaf (born 1993), Iraqi footballer

See also
Abdul Wahid

Compound given names